Maria Jespersen (born 3 December 1991) is a Danish tennis player.

Jespersen has a career high WTA doubles ranking of 872, achieved on 16 April 2018. She has won two ITF doubles titles.

Jespersen has represented Denmark in Fed Cup, where she has a win–loss record of 3–1.

ITF finals (2–1)

Doubles: 3 (2–1)

External links

 
 
 

1991 births
Living people
Danish female tennis players
Sportspeople from Copenhagen
People from Helsingør Municipality
21st-century Danish women